The EHF Champions League is the most important club handball competition for men's teams in Europe and involves the leading teams from the top European nations. The competition is organised every year by EHF. The official name for the men's competition is the EHF Champions League Men.

The EHF coefficient rank decides which teams have access and in which stage they enter.

Eligibility and qualifying

Each year, the EHF publishes a ranking list of its member federations. The first 9 nations are automatically permitted to participate in the tournament with their national champion. The national federation ranked one in the EHF European League currently Germany, is awarded a second qualification berth for the domestic runner-up. The remaining 6 positions are designated through wildcards, with each national federation without 2 teams already qualified able to submit a single applicant. The wildcards are judged on five criteria: venue, TV, spectators, results in past EHF competitions and product management and digital.

Tournament format

Each year, the EHF publishes a ranking list of its member federations. The first nine nations are allowed to participate in the tournament with their national champion. In addition, the tenth spot is reserved for the best ranked national federation of the EHF European League Men. The national federations are allowed to request upgrades for their teams eligible to play in the EHF European League and based on the criteria list the EHF Executive Committee approves six upgrades.

The EHF Champions League is divided into four stages. All participating teams enter the competition in the group phase.

The current playing system has been introduced before the 2020/21 season.

Group phase 
Since the 2020/21 season, the format sees two groups formed, with eight teams each in Group A and B. All the teams in each group play each other twice, in home and away matches (14 rounds in total). The first two teams in Groups A and B advance directly to the quarter-finals, while teams from positions three to six in each of these groups proceed to the playoff. The season is over for the last two teams in each group after the completion of the group phase.

Play off 
The pairings for the playoff are decided by the placement of the teams at the end of the group phase (A6 vs B3, B6 vs A3, A5 vs B4 and B5 vs A4). Each pairing is decided via a home and away format, with the aggregate winners over the two legs advancing to the quarter-finals. The higher ranked teams in the group phase have the home right advantage in the second leg.

Quarter-finals

The pairings for the quarter-finals are also decided by the placement in the group phase (Winner of A5/B4 vs A1, Winner B5/A4 vs B1, Winner A6/B3 vs A2, Winner B6/A3 vs B2). The ties are decided through a home and away format, with the four winners over the two legs played in each pairing advancing to the EHF FINAL4. The higher ranked teams in the group phase have the home right advantage in the second leg.

EHF FINAL4

The official name for the men's EHF FINAL4 is the EHF FINAL4 Men. The participating EHF FINAL4 teams are paired for the semifinals through a draw and play the last two matches of the season over a single weekend at one venue. The two semi-finals are played on a Saturday, with the third-place game and final on a Sunday.

Brand Sound
Much like the visual brand identity, the brand sound identity will acoustically connect the various leagues and tournaments which fit under the EHF umbrella. For the EHF Brand Sound, the authors got to the core of "The Sound of Handball" and created a handball sound DNA as the recurring element across all audio-visual applications. The jump shot was identified as the most iconic and defining handball movement.

Through video analysis and motion tracking, the jump shot was extracted into a rhythmic design pattern. There are numerous application opportunities of the brand sound, which will be developed over time. First  implementations of the new EHF Brand Sound will be heard in the EHF Champions League. The premium character of this tournament was translated into a modern sound design through a new EHF Champions League sound logo and anthem. Both will come to life in the arena and will consistently complement all audio-visual communications.

The previous anthem for the EHF Champions League is "Hymn of the Champions", used until the end of the 2019/20 season and exclusively written by Austrian film composer Roman Kariolou in 2007. The recording played during the entry ceremony before every game was performed by the Bratislava Symphony Orchestra, conducted by David Hernando.

Winners

European Champions Cup (organised by IHF)

EHF Champions League 

Notes: 
 Bold : Aggregate 
 Bold-italic : Winner's goals

Records and statistics

Winning clubs

Titles by country

Notes
Results until the Dissolution of the Soviet Union in 1991. Three out of five titles were won by clubs from present day Belarus, while two titles and the additional three times runners-up were achieved by clubs from present day Russia.
Results until the Breakup of Yugoslavia in the early 1990s. Clubs from present day Serbia won the title two times and were runners-up additional two times, clubs from present day Croatia won the title once and were runners-up three times, clubs from present day Bosnia and Herzegovina won the title once and were runners-up once, while clubs from present day Slovenia were runners-up one time.
Results until the Dissolution of Czechoslovakia in 1993. Three titles and two times runners-up were all achieved by HC Dukla Prague.

All-time top scorers

All-time Final Four top scorers

Goals scored in the Final Four by nations
All the goals (3095) scored in the Final Four by the nationality of the players. 
Last updated after the 2021/22 season.

Sponsorship
Select Sport
Hummel International

See also
EHF European League
EHF European Cup

References

External links

 
European Handball Federation competitions
Recurring sporting events established in 1956
Multi-national professional sports leagues